Malakichthys similis is a species of fish.

References

Acropomatidae
Fish described in 2004